Marsh St. Johnswort is a common name for several plants and may refer to:

Hypericum elodes, a species native to western Europe
Triadenum, a genus native to North America